Solveig Ericsson (24 January 1932 – 19 April 2016) was a Swedish athlete. She competed in the women's high jump at the 1952 Summer Olympics.

References

1932 births
2016 deaths
Athletes (track and field) at the 1952 Summer Olympics
Swedish female high jumpers
Olympic athletes of Sweden
Place of birth missing